Alien Father is an American four-piece experimental punk rock band from New Jersey, United States. Formed in 2006, the band describes their sound as "Avant Garage". They were an influential force in the American experimental punk rock genre emerging in the mid-2000s.

Members

Current members
Dave Hallinger – vocals, guitar
Curtis Regian – vocals, synth, piano, guitar
Mike Topley – drums
Chris Yaple – bass, vocals

Past members
Conor Meara - bass
Alex Zilinski

Discography

EPs
 Help Me, Alien Father! (2006)

Studio albums
 Izlaz and Isprat (2007)
 Never Forget (2007)
 Paste (2007)
 Knives with Journalism (2008)
 Sunday at the Speedway (2010)
 World of Treble 7" (2012)

References

External links 
 Alien Father Bandcamp
 Discogs

American experimental rock groups
Punk rock groups from New Jersey